Bellagio is a comune (municipality) in the Province of Como in the Italian region of Lombardy. It is located on Lake Como, also known by its Latin-derived name Lario, whose arms form an inverted Y. The triangular land mass at the base of the inverted Y is the Larian Triangle: at its northern point sits Bellagio, looking across to the northern arm of the lake and, behind it, the Alps. It has always been famous for its location. It belongs to a mountain community named Comunità montana del Triangolo lariano (Larian Triangle mountain community), based in Canzo.

Geography 

Bellagio is situated upon the cape of the land mass that divides Lake Como in two. The city centre occupies the tip of the promontory, while other districts are scattered along the lake shores and up the slopes of the hills. The great Pleistocene glaciations with their imposing flows coming from the Valtellina and Valchiavenna modelled the actual landscape of Lake Como: at least four times the glaciers went as far as Brianza to the south. From the ancient glacial blanket only the highest tops emerged, one of them Mount St. Primo, which obliged the glaciers to divide into two arms.

Nowadays, a luxuriance of trees and flowers is favoured by a mild and sweet climate.

The Borgo
The historic centre of Bellagio shelters 350m southwest of the promontory of the Larian Triangle, between the Villa Serbelloni on the hill and the Como arm of the lake. At the far tip of the promontory are a park and a marina. Parallel to the shore are three streets, Mazzini, Centrale and Garibaldi in ascending order. Cutting across them to form a sloped grid are seven medieval stone stairs ("salite") running uphill. The Basilica of San Giacomo and a stone tower, sole relic of medieval defences ("Torre delle Arti Bellagio"), sit in a piazza at the top.

History

Before the Romans 
Even though there are signs of a human presence around Bellagio in the Paleolithic Period (about 30,000 years ago), it is only in the 7th to 5th centuries BC that there appears on the promontory a castellum, perhaps a place of worship and of exchange which served the numerous small villages on the lake.

The first identifiable inhabitants of the territory of Bellagio, from 400BC, were the Insubres, a Celtic tribe in part of Lombardy and on Lake Como up to the centre of the lake, occupying the western shore (the Orobii had the northern arm of the lake and its east bank). The Insubres lived free and independently until the arrival of the Gauls, led by Belloveso, who, around the year 600 BC, undid the Insubres and settled in Milan and Como, occupying the shores of the lake and creating a garrison at the extreme point of their conquest, Bellagio (fancifully Bellasium, named after their commander Belloveso). The Gauls thus became Gallo-Insubres, merged with the primitive inhabitants and introduced their customs and traditions, leaving traces in local names: Crux Galli (now Grosgalla), on the side of Lezzeno, and Gallo, a small chapel on the old road of Limonta which marks today the border between the two municipalities.

The Romans
In 225 BC, the territory of the Gallo-Insubres was occupied by the Romans, in their gradual expansion to the north. The Romans, led by consul Marcus Claudius Marcellus, defeated the Gallo-Insubres in a fierce battle near Camerlata, occupying Como and the shores of the lake. Insubre hopes of independence were raised by an alliance with Hannibal during the Second Punic War, but dashed by defeat in 104 BC and absorption into a Roman province in 80 BC.

Bellagio became both a Roman garrison and a point of passage and wintering for the Roman armies on their way through to the province of Raetia and the Splügen pass. Troops wintered at the foot of the present Villa Serbelloni, sheltered from north winds and the Mediterranean climate. Such variant Latin names as Belacius and Bislacus suggest Bellagio was originally Bi-lacus ("between the lakes").

Between 81 and 77 BC Cornelius Scipio brought 3,000 Latin colonists to Lake Como. From 59 BC Julius Caesar, as pro-consul, brought up another 5000 colonists, most importantly 500 Greeks from Sicily. Their names are still borne by their descendants. Bellagio became a mixture of races which became more and more complex in the following centuries. Also it increased its strategic importance because, as well as a place for wintering, it sheltered warships especially at Loppia, where the natural creek made it easy to repair them. Around Loppia there formed one of the first suburbs of Bellagio.

The Romans introduced many Mediterranean crops, including the olive and bay laurel; from the name of the latter (Laurus) derives the Latin name of Lake Como (Larius). Among the other plant species introduced were the chestnut, already widespread in southern Italy, the cypress, so well naturalised today  as to be considered native, and many kinds of herbaceous plants.

In the early decades of the Empire, two great figures brought fame to the lake and Bellagio: Virgil and Pliny the Younger. Virgil, the Latin poet, visited Bellagio and remembered the lake in the second book of the Georgics, verse 155 ("or great Lario"). Pliny the Younger, resident in Como for most of the year, had, among others, a summer villa near the top of the hill of Bellagio; it was known as "Tragedy". Pliny describes in a letter the long periods he spent in his Bellagio villas, not only studying and writing but also hunting and fishing.

Through Bellagio passed, in 9 AD, the Roman legions (partly composed of soldiers from the Bellagio garrison) led by Publius Quinctilius Varus, which had to cross the Splügen pass into Germany against Arminius. They were annihilated in the Battle of the Teutoburg Forest.

The Middle Ages 

At the time of the barbarian invasions, Narses, a general of Justinian, in his long wanderings through Italy waging war, created along Lake Como a fortified line against the Goths. The line included the fortress of Bellagio, the Isola Comacina and the Castel Baradello.

Nevertheless, around 568 the Lombards, led by Alboin, poured into the Po Valley and settled in various parts of Lombardy, in the valleys of the Alps and along the lakes. Even the fortress of Bellagio was occupied. In 744 King Liutprand settled there.

With their arrival in Italy, the Franks of Charlemagne descended on Piedmont and Lombardy and, through the high Alps, defeated the Lombards in the battle of Pavia of 773. The Lombard territory was divided into counties — thus the beginning of feudalism. Bellagio found itself in the county of Milan under the suzerainty of the Frankish kings.

The grandson of Charlemagne, Lothair, having deposed his father in 834, invested as feudal lords of the territory of Limonta and Civenna the monks of Saint Ambrose of Milan (together with the territory of Campione d'Italia). The inhabitants of these two places, which later belonged ecclesiastically to the parish of Bellagio (St. John), were obliged to hand over some of their produce (olive oil, chestnuts ...) to the monks, an obligation preserved for several centuries.

There followed the rule of the Ottonian dynasty of Germany. During the reign of Henry V began a long war over the succession to the bishop of Como between Milan, supporting a bishop imposed by the German Emperor, and Como, which had already designated as bishop Guido Grimoldi, consecrated by the Pope. The war lasted ten years (1117–1127), with a series of small victories and defeats on land and water. Bellagio participated with its fleet as an ally of Milan, Isola Comacina and Gravedona. The war ended with the destruction of Como and its subjection to Milan, from which it took decades to recover. It is thought that by 1100 Bellagio was already a free commune and seat of a tribunal and that its dependence on Como was merely formal. However the strategic position of Bellagio was very important for the city of Como, and Bellagio had therefore to suffer more than one incursion from Como and fought numerous naval battles against its neighbour. In 1154, under Frederick Barbarossa, Bellagio was forced to swear loyalty and pay tribute to Como.

In 1169, after the destruction of Milan by Frederick Barbarossa (1162), Como attacked Isola Comacina, devastating it and forcing the inhabitants to flee to Varenna and Bellagio, at that time considered impregnable fortresses. The Lombard League was formed, in which Bellagio also participated as an ally of Milan, intervening in the Battle of Legnano (1176) against Barbarossa and Como.

The Renaissance and the Baroque

Towards the end of the 13th century, Bellagio, which had participated in numerous wars on the side of the Ghibellines (the pro-empire party), became part of the property of the House of Visconti and was integrated into the Duchy of Milan.

In 1440, during the lordship of the Visconti, some Cernobbiesi attacked the prison of Bellagio in which the inmates were political prisoners. Liberated, they took flight into mountains of Bellagio, settling in a town that took the name of Cernobbio in memory of the country of origin of their liberators.

With the death of Filippo Maria, the House of Visconti lost power. For a short time the area was transformed into the Ambrosian Republic (1447–50), until Milan capitulated to Francesco Sforza, who became Duke of Milan and Lombardy. Bellagio, whose territory (and especially the fortress) was occupied by the troops of Sforza in 1449 during the war of succession, was one of the first towns on the lake to take sides and adhere to Sforza rule.

In 1508, under Ludovico il Moro (1479–1508), the estate of Bellagio was taken from the bishop of Como and assigned to the Marquis of Stanga, treasurer, ambassador and friend of il Moro. Stanga built a new villa on Bellagio hill, later ruined in a raid by Cavargnoni.

In 1535, when Francesco II Sforza (the last Duke of Milan) died, there started for Lombardy and the land around the Lake of Lario two centuries of Spanish rule (the period in which Alessandro Manzoni's novel The Betrothed is set). The so-called Derta steps that lead from the neighbourhood of Guggiate to that of Suira were built under the Spanish.

In 1533, Francesco Sfondrati, married to a Visconti, had acquired the fiefdom of Bellagio and for more than 200 years the Sfondrati family, from the highest rank of Milanese society, ruled Bellagio. The ruins of the sumptuous Stanga building were restructured by Francesco and, successively, by Ercole Sfondrati, who spent the last years of his life in pious religious passion in the villa. On the same peninsula he built the church and convent of the Capuchins (1614), investing enormous capital in the setting, where appeared cypress trees and sweet olives.

Favoured by Bellagio's ideal position for transport and trade, various small industries flourished, most notably candle-making and silk weaving with its concomitant silk worms and mulberry trees. With the death in 1788 of Carlo, last of the Sfondrati, Bellagio passed to Count Alessandro Serbelloni, henceforth Serbelloni Sfondrati.

The 18th and 19th centuries 

During the brief Napoleonic period, the port of Bellagio assumed military and strategic importance. A decision, apparently of secondary importance, was to guide the destiny of Bellagio for the two succeeding two centuries: the decision of Count Francesco Melzi d'Eril, Duke of Lodi and Vice President of the Cisalpine Republic to establish here his summer home. Count Melzi proceeded to build a villa on the west bank near Loppia. That brought to the area the flower of the Milanese nobility and the promontory was transformed into an elegant and refined court. Roads suitable for carriages were built, first of all to link the villas and the palaces and then towards the town centre; finally the provincial road Erba–Bellagio was completed. The fame of the lakeside town became well known outside the borders of the Kingdom of Lombardy–Venetia: even the Emperor Francis I of Austria visited in 1816 and returned in 1825 to stay in the Villas Serbelloni, Trotti and Melzi.

The Romantic discovery of landscape was changing how the Italian lakes were seen. Stendhal had first visited in 1810:

At Bellagio he was the guest of the Melzi d’Eril, from whose villa he wrote:

Franz Liszt and his mistress Comtesse Marie d'Agoult stayed for four months of 1837 on their way from Switzerland to Como and Milan. In Bellagio he wrote many of the piano pieces which became Album d'un voyageur (1835–38), landscapes seen through the eyes of Byron and Senancour. These works contributed much to the image of Bellagio and the lake as a site of Romantic feeling. D'Agoult's letters show they were sadly aware of drawing an age of motorised tourism in their train.

In 1838, Bellagio received with all honours the Emperor Ferdinand I, the Archduke Rainer and the Minister Metternich, who came from Varenna on the Lario, the first steamboat on the lake, launched in 1826. Bellagio was one of the localities most frequented by the Lombardy nobility and saw the construction of villas and gardens. Luxury shops opened in the village and tourists crowded onto the lakeshore drive. Space was not sufficient and it was decided to cover the old port which came up as far as the arcade in order to construct a large square.

Gustav Flaubert visited Bellagio in 1845. He told his travel diary:

The Risorgimento
In 1859, as part of the Second Italian War of Independence, Garibaldi's Hunters of the Alps defeated Austrian troops at San Fermo, entering Como and bringing the province under Piedmontese rule. Bellagio thus became part of the Kingdom of Italy under the House of Savoy until Germany created in 1943 the puppet Italian Social Republic under Benito Mussolini.

Tourism in the Kingdom of Italy had now become the principal economic resource of the people of Bellagio and from this period on the history of Bellagio coincides with that of its hotels. The first was the present Hotel Metropole, founded in 1825 from the transformation of the old hostelry of Abbondio Genazzini into the first real hotel on the Lario, the Hotel Genazzini. Following this example in the space of a few years came several splendid hotels many of which are still operating, frequently in the hands of the same families who founded them: the Hotel Firenze, built on the old house of the captain of the Lario opened in 1852; the Grand Hotel Bellagio (now the Grand Hotel Villa Serbelloni) opened in 1872. In 1888 the three largest hotels (Genazzini, Grande Bretagne and Grand Hotel Bellagio) first replaced gaslight with electric, and only after this were they followed by many patrician houses. Bellagio was one of the first Italian tourist resorts to become international, but it has never degenerated into a place of mass tourism.

The 20th century
Bellagio was part of the Italian Social Republic (RSI) from 1943 to 1945. The Futurist writer and poet Filippo Tommaso Marinetti, a Mussolini loyalist who had helped shape Fascist philosophy, remained in the RSI as a propagandist until his death from a heart attack at Bellagio in December, 1944.

Luchino Visconti put Bellagio in a scene of his film Rocco and His Brothers (1960). The scene is on the Europa Promenade, between the pier and the half-derelict Hotel Grande Bretagne. Rocco implies that the old hotels are fading along with the empires they served. The fact that working-class Rocco and his girlfriend are there to make the observation implies in turn the new world of mass tourism replacing them. Ironies lie beyond the scope of the film: the new American empire would find uses of its own for Bellagio.   

In 2014, Bellagio merged with the town of Civenna: the new municipality retains the name of Bellagio.

Buildings

Churches
 , in the Piazza della Chiesa; Lombard-Romanesque 1075–1125. The base of the bell tower incorporates ancient town defences; the top is 18th century. Inside, a 12th-century cross, a 1432 triptych by Foppa, a 16th-century altarpiece. The Bar Sport across the square occupies a former monastery. 
 Church of San Giorgio, next to the town hall. The church was built 1080–1120. Inside, a statue and fresco of Our Lady of the Belt. The Genazzini Stairs run under the bell tower to the public library.
 Church of San Martino, in Visgnola;
 Church of Sant'Antonio Abate, in Casate;
 Church of San Carlo Borromeo, to Aureggio;
 Church of San Biagio, in Pescallo;
 Church of Sant'Andrea, in Guggiate.

Villas
Along the banks of the promontory of Bellagio are many old patrician houses, each surrounded by parks and gardens of trees. Some like Villa Serbelloni and Villa Melzi d'Esti are open to the public.

Villa Serbelloni
Just behind the hill of the promontory into the lake, protected from the winds, is the building complex of Villa Serbelloni. The villa dominates the town's historic centre. It can be reached from Via Garibaldi. It was built in the 15th century in place of an old castle razed in 1375. Villa Serbelloni was later rebuilt several times. In 1788 it came into the possession of Alessandro Serbelloni (1745–1826) who enriched it with precious decorations and works of art of the 17th and 18th centuries. Today you can visit only the gardens. The trails, as well as the villa, lead to the remains of the 16th-century Capuchin monastery and the Sfondrata, a residence built by the Sfondrati family indeed, overlooking the Lecco branch of the lake.

On the inside, elegant halls with vault and coffered ceilings follow one another accurately decorated in the style of the 17th and 18th centuries. All around, the park develops along most of the promontory of Bellagio with vast tracts of thick woods where the Serbelloni gardeners had traced paths which nowadays still lead the way amongst the small clearings and English style gardens.

As noted by Balbiani, rather than being a garden, it is a real "wood, opened by spacious and comfortable paths, and plants with all generations of high trunk trees"; amongst which, oak trees, conifers, fir trees, holm oaks, osmanti, myrtles and junipers, "but above all trees, here situated is the pine tree, which, with its gnarled trunk acts as a screen against the storms".

Occasionally, the vegetation thins out at panoramic points which overlook the two branches of the lake, offering a prospect from the slopes of the hill, where the rose bushes flower during the season with their varied colours. The roughness of the rocky plane along the winding path which goes up to the villa has not stopped the construction of terraces and flower beds with yews and boxes trimmed geometrically. Along the upper part of the park is a long row of cypress trees and some palm trees of considerable dimensions.

In 1905, the villa was transformed into a luxury hotel. In 1959 it became the property of the Rockefeller Foundation of New York at the bequest of the American-born Princess of Thurn and Taxis, who had bought it in 1930. Since 1960 the Bellagio Center in the villa has been home to international conferences housed in the former villa or in the grounds. In addition, outstanding scholars and artists are selected for one-month residencies year-round.

Quite different is the Grand Hotel Villa Serbelloni on the water's edge. A luxurious neo-classical villa built in the 1850s for an aristocratic Milanese family became the nucleus of the (then-called) Grand Hotel Bellagio, opened in 1873. The hotel retains its original Belle Époque fittings.

Villa Melzi d'Eril 

This significant building overlooking the lake was built between 1808 and 1815 by the architect Giocondo Albertolli for Francesco Melzi d'Eril, created Duke of Lodi by Napoleon for whom he filled the role of vice-president of the Italian Republic from 1802. From 1805, with the advent of the short-lived Napoleonic Kingdom of Italy, he was its Chancellor.

Even after his political career had ended, since this was a Melzi residence, the construction, which he wanted as elegant as the Royal Villa of Monza and the other villas around Lake of Como, was decorated and furnished by famous artists of the period: painters Appiani and Bossi, sculptors Canova and Comolli, and the medalist Luigi Manfredini.  The duke had a collector's passion which, in the region on Lake Como, had no rival except that of Giovan Battista Sommariva, owner of the villa bearing the same name (nowadays Villa Carlotta) who, politically defeated by Melzi himself (preferred by Napoleon as vice-president), tried to regain lost prestige by assembling an extraordinary art collection.

Villa Melzi is set in English style gardens which develop harmoniously along the banks of the lake, the last reaches of the view from Bellagio towards the hills to the south. Making such a garden required notable changes to the structure of the land and outstanding supporting walls. In such surroundings, enriched by monuments, artefacts (amongst which are a Venetian gondola transported to Bellagio expressly for Napoleon, and two precious Egyptian statues), rare exotic plants, ancient trees, hedges of camellias, groves of azaleas and gigantic rhododendrons, the villa, the chapel and the glass house constitute an ensemble in which the neoclassical style reaches one of its highest peaks.

Sport

Rowing
Rowing is based at the Bellagina Sporting Union, a club specializing in football and especially rowing: world rowing champions Enrico Gandola, Alberto Belgeri, Igor Pescialli, Franco Sancassani and Daniele Gilardoni were born in Bellagio and began their racing careers with Bellagina.

Cycling
From Bellagio starts the climb to the Sanctuary of the Madonna del Ghisallo, the patron saint of cyclists, and therefore an important destination for fans of the sport. The ascent covers a total distance of about 4 km and has a vertical rise of about 500 meters; professional cyclists can do it in 20 minutes. You can also make the climb from Onno to Valbrona on the eastern shore of the lake, and the Wall of Sormano on the road to the western shore. These two climbs, with the ascent to the Sanctuary, are part of the Tris del Lario competition.

Trekking
Treks of all degrees of difficulty are possible around and above Bellagio on the Larian Triangle. Bellagio Lifestyle gives the major treks with maps and route descriptions.

Cuisine
Eaten with a wooden spoon, it is composed of polenta mixed with butter and cheese and accompanied with dried fish from the lake, cold, stuffed chicken or home-made salami. Red wine is shared from a communal jug. For dessert, miasca—cake made with cornflour and dried fruit; —made with white and yellow flour, eggs, butter, milk and elder flowers; or —a wafer of white flour, milk and sugar.

Transport

Air 
The airports nearest to Bellagio are:
 Malpensa International Airport (MXP), Milan
 Linate Airport (LIN), Milan
 Orio al Serio International Airport (BGY), Bergamo
 Lugano airport (LUG) 
From these airports, trains are available to lake hubs such as Como and Lecco. From there, bus services travel to Bellagio and other lakeside locations frequently.  From Lugano, bus service is available to Menaggio, from which a ferry can be taken to Bellagio. Chartered seaplanes also land on the lake itself.

Rail 
The railway lines nearest to Bellagio are:
 Milan–Como (two lines, operated by Trenord)
 Milan–Lecco-Tirano (operated by Trenord)
 Milan–Asso (operated by Trenord)
For more information on trains, see Trenitalia or Trenord  (in Italian)

Water 
A hydrofoil runs from Como to Bellagio, making stops at the other towns on Lake Como along the way. Car ferries also runs from Varenna and Cadenabbia to Bellagio. These are much shorter trips of less than 15 minutes. For more information, visit Gestione Governativa Navigazione Laghi.

Easy access to Bellagio can be found via ferry. There is no direct train to Bellagio, but the closest stop is Varenna.

Road 

Bellagio is accessible on either side of the Larian Triangle by slow, narrow and winding roads from Como or Lecco. It is much safer to drive from Como up to Cadenabbia and use the reasonably priced car ferry for the quick trip across to Bellagio. An alternative is to take the four-lane road on the eastern shore of the right arm of the lake to Varenna, then take the ferry to Bellagio. Narrow stone stairs make most of the Borgo inaccessible to cars.

Public buses run daily from Como to Bellagio.

Twin towns 

Bellagio is a founding member of the Douzelage, a unique town twinning association of 24 towns across the European Union. This active town twinning began in 1991 and there are regular events, such as a produce market from each of the other countries and festivals.  Discussions regarding membership are also in hand with three further towns (Agros in Cyprus, Škofja Loka in Slovenia, and Tryavna in Bulgaria).

References

Further reading 
 
  The source of many historical details of Como, its lake and villas;  as well as Bellagio.

External links 

  
 News and Events: Bellagio
 Online survey of the artistic output of Lombardy, including Bellagio.
 The website of the Gardens of the Villa Melzi
 The website of the Hotel Metropole with scholarly articles about the past and historic photos

Cities and towns in Lombardy